The Limbang District is one of the two districts of Limbang Division, Malaysia. It has a total area of 3,978.10 square kilometres. The major town is Limbang. It has one sub-district, which is Nanga Medamit Sub-District. It borders Brunei Darussalam to the west and east, Lawas District to the southeast and Miri District at the south and southwest. Due to being squeezed in between Brunei at its north and coastal areas, Limbang is accessible by road only by going through immigration posts.

History 
The area was annexed by Charles Anthoni Johnson Brooke, the second Rajah of Sarawak in 1890 from Brunei to become the fifth division of Sarawak. The annexation was strongly disputed by Brunei.

The de facto boundary ran along the watershed between the Brunei River and Limbang River basins on the western side of the district, and along the length of the Pandaruan River on the eastern side. Boundary agreements have delineated a stretch of the western border and the Pandaruan River while the other stretches have yet to be delineated.

Limbang area is officially claimed since 1967 (it has been claimed since 1880s after the annexation of Limbang by the White Rajah) by Brunei as part of its integral territory. It is the main part of the Brunei–Malaysia border disputes since Limbang separates Brunei territorially into two parts. The issue was said to have been settled in 2009 as has been stated from Bruneian media. However, Bruneian Second Minister of Foreign Affairs and Trade Lim Jock Seng said the issue was never discussed during the meeting of both countries' leaders.

Demography 
The population of Limbang district (year 2000) was 40,959.

Ethnicity 
Limbang is traditionally a home to Bruneian Malay, Kedayan, Chinese, Iban, Lun Bawang and Orang Ulu people.

Limbang is the most culturally diverse and distinct part of Sarawak. It is a melting pot of many cultures, including Malay, Kedayan, Chinese, Iban and various Orang Ulu ethnic groups such as Lun Bawang, Bisaya, Murut, Kelabit and Penan. It has one of the highest concentration of Orang Ulu people in Sarawak.

Note:
1 Excluding Kedayan.
2 Including Kedayan and other Orang Ulu such as Lun Bawang, Kelabit, Penan, Murut etc.

Economy 
The economy is largely based on the timber and agricultural industries. Timber industry remains a strong component of the district's economy. Agriculture is relatively minor although growing steadily, with oil palm, rattan and pepper the main products.

Transportation

Road 
Owing to its geographical location, Limbang is completely cut off from the rest of Sarawak's road network. It is however has good road links to both parts of Brunei located to the east and west of the district. There is also a good local network of roads in the district.

There are two road border crossing checkpoints in Limbang district, both into Brunei.

 Pandaruan: This checkpoint is located 15 km east of Limbang on the Pandaruan River which forms the border between Sarawak and Brunei's Temburong District. The checkpoint on the Brunei side is called Puni.
 Tedungan: Located 43 km west of Limbang, it is the road crossing into the main part of Brunei from Limbang. The Brunei checkpoint is called Kuala Lurah.

Air 
There are existing small airports that served the division through MASwings namely Limbang Airport in Limbang to Kota Kinabalu, Kuching, Lawas and Miri.

Infrastructure

Education 
Limbang District has five secondary schools: SMK Limbang, SMKA Limbang, SMK Medamit, SMK Seri Patiambun Limbang and SMK Kubong. It has numerous primary schools, mostly scattered around Limbang rural areas.

Healthcare 
Limbang has its own hospital which is Hospital Limbang. However, as for surgeries and more critical cases, they are normally referred to Miri Hospital, or to greater extent, Sarawak General Hospital in Kuching.

Security 
Limbang District has a police district office. There are also police stations and police bits located at strategic locations, as well as rural areas. Despite being the fourth largest division, Limbang Division so far has no district military bases. This is also true for Limbang District. Only small military camps do exist just to make presence at Limbang district.

Government services 
Other government offices have set up their branches in Limbang Districts such as Royal Customs, Fire and Rescue Department, Education Department etc.

See also
 Lawas District
 Limbang Division
 Limbang Town
 Sarawak

References

External links
 Laman Web Majlis Daerah Limbang
 Welcome to Jabatan Residen Bahagian Limbang,Sarawak!

 
Brunei–Malaysia border crossings
Former disputed land areas
Territorial disputes of Brunei
Territorial disputes of Malaysia
Brunei–Malaysia border